NGC 1723 is a barred spiral galaxy in the constellation Eridanus. The galaxy is listed in the New General Catalogue. It was discovered on September 13, 1863, by the astronomer Albert Marth.

References

External links 
 

Eridanus (constellation)
Barred spiral galaxies
1723
016493